Aechmea angustifolia is a plant species in the genus Aechmea. This species is native to Central America and northern South America (Bolivia, Ecuador, Colombia, Venezuela, Guyana, Peru, northern Brazil).

Cultivars
The species is widely cultivated as an ornamental. Cultivars include:

 Aechmea 'Brimstone'
 Aechmea 'El Morro'
 Aechmea 'Hellfire'
 Aechmea 'La Espriella'
 Aechmea 'Regine de Ligne'

References

angustifolia
Flora of Central America
Flora of South America
Plants described in 1838